Common Ground is a 1983 album by American folk rock musician Richie Havens.

Album was recorded at Stone Castle Studios in Carimate (Como) Italy.

Track listing 
All tracks composed by Pino Daniele and Richie Havens; except where indicated
 "Death At an Early Age" (Greg Chansky)
 "Gay Cavalier" (Pino Daniele, Richie Havens, William Rafael)
 "Lay Ye Down Boys" (Ken Lauber, Merritt Melloy)
 "This Is The Hour" 
 "Stand Up" (Pino Daniele, Kelvin Bullen)
 "Dear John" (Maury Yeston)
 "Leave Well Enough Alone" 
 "Moonlight Rain" 
 "Things Must Change"

Personnel 

 Richie Havens - vocal, arrangements
 Pino Daniele - arrangements, backing vocals, guitar, keyboards
 Allan Goldberg - arrangements
 Joe Amoruso - keyboards
 Jennifer Lessing - backing vocals
 Linda Wesley - backing vocals
 Jeremy Meek - bass
 Tullio De Piscopo - drums
 Enzo Avitabile - flute
 Kelvin Bullen -  guitar
 Aldo Banfi - synclavier
 Danny Cummings - percussion
 Mel Collins - saxophone
 Arnold David Clapman - cover artwork

Releases 

The album was released on vinyl and tape.

Notes and sources

External links 
 http://www.allmusic.com/album/common-ground-mw0000845901

Richie Havens albums
1983 albums